"Didn't Expect It to Go Down This Way" is a song written and recorded by American country music artist K. T. Oslin.  It was released in October 1989 as the fifth single from the album This Woman.  The song reached #23 on the Billboard Hot Country Singles & Tracks chart.

Chart performance

References

1989 singles
1988 songs
K. T. Oslin songs
Songs written by K. T. Oslin
Song recordings produced by Harold Shedd
RCA Records singles